Badwan() is a Union Council, situated on the bank of River Swat at an altitude of . It is a part of Adenzai Tehsil of Lower Dir District, Khyber-Pakhtunkhwa. It contains many small villages including Badwan Upper, Badwan Lower, Badwan Khambo, Shamlai, Baghkandi, Ramyal, Othar, Safrona, Gadar, Barorri, Leko, Ghwando, Torogato, Swato Banda, Ghazo etc. Its population is approximately 25,000.
In the past Badwan was a part of a union council known as Khadagzai Abazai which comprised Badwan, Brangola and Khadagzai. But now Badwan is a separate union council.

Nazims / Naib-Nazims

Education 
There is a boy's high secondary school, a girl's high school and around 45 Primary schools for boys and girls. Haq Public School, Pak Cambridge School and Standard Public School are private educational institutions in the area. Some families prefer to send their children to the private schools as they may offer better education. Others prefer to send their children to Jamal English Education Academy, Chakdara Public School, and University Public School(UOM) etc. situated in Chakdara. All of these schools provide pick and drop services to students. Most of the students study until Matriculation and stop because of lack of access and high cost of going to nearby towns. A small number of male students go to Gulabad Degree College for Boys and University of Malakand, Chakdara. A very small number of female students go to FEF girls college, Chakdara.

Military Operation Against Taliban 
During the military operation of the Malakand division against Taliban insurgents Badwan was declared clean and there were no Taliban insurgents. The residents of Badwan showed hospitality to the internally displaced persons (IDP) and gave shelter to them. They shared their houses and food with them and furthermore, they also helped them in finding medical assistance. A school was established for the kids of the IDPs where volunteers would teach. Those who got shelter in Badwan, appreciate the honesty and support of the locals.

Income Sources 

Agriculture is the main source of income of most of the people. Many people are also working as government employees, mostly in the education sector. Most of the females are housewives though some are working in the education and health departments. Young people go to other cities like Rawalpindi, Karachi, Muzaffarabad, Islamabad, Lahore etc., to find jobs. Some people are also working abroad in different countries like Saudi Arabia, UAE, South Korea, Malaysia, Europe etc.

Sports 

Most of the young boys play Cricket and Football (Soccer) in the evening. The people of Badwan (especially Badwan Bala) are good players of volleyball. Tournaments are arranged by people which may be only for local teams or sometimes teams from nearby towns also participate. The main problem which the players are facing is not having a proper playground and funds.

Flora and Vegetation
A diverse range of trees are found in Badwan. Among these, Poplar, Mulberries (Morus alba L., Morus nigra L.), pines (in Hilly areas), Kikar and figs etc. are commonly found.

There are also many kind of fruits such as, persimmon, plum and peach etc. which are extensively grown in the fields. Wheat, maize, rice, sugarcane and vegetables like tomato, potato, onion, radish, turnip and spinach etc. are also grown.

PTCL and Cellphone Services 
There is a PTCL digital telephone exchange which covers most of the village. As Badwan is in Dir Lower its area code is 0945. The phone number of the exchange is (+92)(0945) 805000. All the phone numbers are with the prefix 805 and 76 e.g. 805xxx. 76xxxx

All the major cell phone operators which operate in Pakistan are functional in Badwan. They include Mobilink, Telenor, Ufone, Zong and Paktel.

Badwan-Batkhela road project 
Recently, a big project in the area has been completed. A road of a length  connecting Badwan and Batkhela. it gave faster access to the town of Batkhela and will improve the living conditions of the residents of Badwan.

The first big accident on the under-construction road occurred in Ramadan 2012. A resident of Chakdara along with his sister and her family including her husband and three children fell from the under-construction bridge to the Swat river. Unfortunately, no one survived in the accident and the car was also completely destroyed. This sad incident occurred because of poor management of the contractor who did not indicate that the bridge was still under-construction. The river was diverted during the construction of the bridges which resulted in huge costs for the residents of Badwan in terms of land erosion and loss of crops. The completion of the project was delayed because of floods in the river and lack of funds.

Post Office 
There is a branch post office in Badwan. Though, administratively Badwan is a part of district Dir Lower, the post office is attached to the General Post Office of Batkhela. The post code of Badwan is 230 21.

Tourist Attraction Ideas 
Tourism is considered a means of revenue generation. It helps locals to make money and tourists to clear their mind - improve their psychological health. Currently, many tourists come from the neighbouring towns to spend host summer days on the river banks. However, more tourist attractions need to be built to improve the tourism industry. The following ideas may be turned into reality to achieve the goal.
 Ten thousand stairs to the top of Ghazo village can be constructed to attract tourists climb the mountain. This will not only attract local tourists but also international tourists in the long run.
 Running track on the bank of river swat in Sholgara can be constructed which can be an attraction for locals and tourists. Locals can use for exercise in the evening and tourists can visit to enjoy and relieve stress once in a while. Moreover, plantation of trees along sides the track will protect the Sholgara from erosion.

Issues 
One of the biggest issue that the people of Badwan are facing is the lack of Natural Gas (Sui Gas). All the surrounding areas including Chakdara, Btkhela, Totakan etc. has the facility but Badwan is still lacking it.

See also 
 Timergara
 Chakdara
 Ouch
 Shawa
 Shad Begum
 Kityari
 Ramyal

External links
 Frontier Education Foundation
 University of Malakand

References 

Lower Dir District
Populated places in Lower Dir District